Beadling may refer to:

 Pittsburgh Beadling, American football team
 Tom Beadling (born 1996), Australian footballer
 William Beadling (1885–1944), English footballer